Deh-e Salman (also Romanized as Deh-e Salmān and Deh Salmān) is a village in Hendudur Rural District, Sarband District, Shazand County, Markazi Province, Iran. At the 2006 census, its population was 196, in 45 families.

References 

Populated places in Shazand County